Stefan Geosits (27 August 1927 – 20 June 2022) was a Burgenland Croatian Catholic priest in Austria, who worked as a lay theatre manager and director, translator, writer and historian.

Life 
Geosits was born in Szentpéterfa, Vas County, Hungary. In his birthplace he finished elementary school. From 1955, he studied further in Rome and Jerusalem.

Since 1958 Geosits was the parish priest in Klingenbach. He built a parish hall, and expanded the cemetery with a new chapel, consecrated in 1967. The project caused controversy, but the new building, with the old tower retained, was consecrated in 1976.

In Klingenbach, he also immediately founded and headed an amateur Croatian theater group in 1958, translating plays and directing productions. He authored and edited many publications, monographies and religious books in Croatian, German and Hungaria. He was the first to translate the Bible completely into contemporary Burgenland Croatian, working on it over 20 years. The completes books were presented to the public at Schloss Eszterhazy in Eisenstadt in 2014. Geosits received the 2014 culture prize of Burgenland Croats, honouring the translation and his life achievements for religion, culture and understanding among the ethnic groups of the region.

Geosits died in Klingenbach on 20 June 2022, at the age of 94.

Publications 
Source:

 700 Jahre St. Jakobskirche und Pfarre Klingenbach (1976) 
 Die burgenländischen Kroaten im Wandel der Zeit (1986) 
 Ergebnisse der Volkszählungen 1900–1981 (1986)
 Knjiga mudrosti (1996)
 Szentpéterfa = Petrovo Selo = Prostrum: 1221-1996 (1996)
 Vjerovati i živiti (2010) 
 Biblija na gradišćanskohrvatskom jeziku (2014; 5 vol.)

References

External links 
 Biblija za gradišćanske Hrvate - vjerski prijevodi Štefana Geošića hrvatskenovine.at 2012
 PREDSTAVLJENA BIBLIJA NA GRADIŠĆANSKOHRVATSKOM JEZIKU – U NOĆI KNJIGE 2016. U KNJIŽNICI HAZU hazud.hr 2016
 Geosits, Stefan: Die burgenländischen Kroaten im Wandel der Zeiten (in German) literaturzeitschrift.de 1986
 Horvat, Dragutin: Nestroy unter den burgenländischen Kroaten (in German) kakanien-revisited.at 26 September 2003

1927 births
2022 deaths
Burgenland Croats
Austrian male writers
Austrian expatriates in Italy
Austrian expatriates in Israel
20th-century Austrian Roman Catholic priests
People from Vas County
Austrian expatriates in Hungary
Translators of the Bible into Croatian